Sumant Sinha (born 12 February 1965) is an Indian businessman. He is the Chairman and Managing Director of ReNew Power, which was founded by him in 2011. Before Founding the company in 2011, he has worked with Aditya Birla Group, Citibank & ING Barings in various capacities.

Early life and education 
Sumant Sinha was born in Delhi as the son of Yashwant Sinha and Nilima Sinha.

He completed his schooling from St. Columba's School, Delhi in the year 1983. In 1987, he graduated from Indian Institute of Technology Delhi with a bachelor's degree in technology. Later, in 1989, he earned his master's degree in business administration from Indian Institute of Management Calcutta. In 1991, after two years of working with Tata Administrative Services, Sinha obtained another master's degree in international finance from the School of International and Public Affairs, Columbia University. He is also a CFA charter holder and a member of the institute.

Career 
Sumant Sinha started his career with a two year stint at Tata Administrative Services in 1989. After graduating from Columbia University, Sinha worked as an investment banker at Citicorp Securities and ING Barings in the United States and United Kingdom respectively.

Sinha returned to India in 2002 and became the chief financial officer of India's third-largest conglomerate, the Aditya Birla Group. It was during his time as CFO that Aditya Birla Group acquired Ultratech Cement, Novelis, and Idea Cellular. Sumant was also instrumental in the creation of Aditya Birla Group's retail arm, Aditya Birla Retail Limited, where he served as chief executive officer from 2007 to 2008.

Later, in 2008, he joined Suzlon Energy as chief operations officer of India's then one of largest wind energy company. He worked for next 15 months in Suzlon, helping it through the 2008 financial crisis.

In 2011, he founded ReNew Power, an independent renewable power producer headquartered in Gurgaon.

ReNew Power 
Sinha set up ReNew Power in 2011 with a plan to have at least 1000 MW of capacity by 2015. In March 2014, ReNew Power won its first solar power bid, a 57.6MW project in Madhya Pradesh. Sinha led ReNew Power from front, going from zero to 5,800 MW of commissioned capacity in six years, making it one of India's largest independent renewable energy producers. In 2017, the company had an equity valuation of US$2 billion.

In 2016, Sinha established "Sumant Sinha ReNew Centre of Excellence for Energy & Environment" in IIT Delhi.

Family
Sinha is married to Vaishali Nigam Sinha. They have two children.

Awards and recognition

References 

1965 births
Living people
People from Bihar
Indian chief executives
School of International and Public Affairs, Columbia University alumni
People associated with wind power
Businesspeople from Haryana
Indian Institute of Management Calcutta alumni
IIT Delhi alumni
CFA charterholders